The 1996 New England Revolution season was the inaugural season for the New England Revolution both as a club and in Major League Soccer (MLS). The team finished last out of five teams in the Eastern Conference, missing the MLS Cup Playoffs. Following the team's last game of the season, head coach Frank Stapleton resigned on September 26, 1996. He was replaced by Thomas Rongen on November 5, 1996.

Revolution forward Joe-Max Moore was named MLS Player of the Week for Week 18, and Alexi Lalas and Wélton were both named All-Stars for the 1996 MLS All-Star Game.

Pre-season

Initial player allocations

As part of Major League Soccer's first season, teams were each allocated four marquee players before the 1996 MLS Inaugural Player Draft. On October 17, 1995, MLS allocated defender Alexi Lalas and defender Mike Burns to the Revolution. Lalas was a United States national team regular who had played in the 1992 Summer Olympics and 1994 FIFA World Cup and was under contract with Padova in Italy's Serie A, while Burns had played alongside Lalas for the United States in the 1992 Olympics and was playing for Viborg FF in Denmark's Superliga at the time.

On February 5, 1996, MLS allocated American goalkeeper Jim St. Andre of the A-League's New York Centaurs and Italian forward Giuseppe Galderisi, Lalas' teammate at Padova, to the Revolution.

First head coach

On January 4, 1996, the team named Frank Stapleton the first head coach of the New England Revolution. Stapleton was an Irish international who had played for Arsenal, Manchester United, Ajax, Blackburn Rovers, and Bradford City among others.

Draft results

Inaugural player draft

On February 6 and 7, 1996, New England selected 16 players in the Inaugural Player Draft.

College draft

On March 4, 1996, the Revolution selected Paul Keegan, Imad Baba, and Paulo Dos Santos in the College Draft.

Supplemental draft

Following the College Draft, the Revolution selected Beto Naveda, Wélton, and Zak Ibsen in the Supplemental Draft.

Competitions

Major League Soccer

Conference standings

Overall standings

Matches

Honors 
 Team Most Valuable Player: Joe-Max Moore
 Team Scoring Champion: Joe-Max Moore (23 pts, 11 G, 1 A)
 Team Defender of the Year: Francis Okaroh
 MLS All-Star Game Selections: Alexi Lalas, Wélton
 MLS Player of the Week: Joe-Max Moore (Week 18)

References

New England Revolution seasons
New England Revolution
New England Revolution
New England Revolution
Sports competitions in Foxborough, Massachusetts